Ragnarök is a supervillain appearing in American comic books published by Marvel Comics. A cyborg clone of the hero Thor, Ragnarök has a similar appearance and abilities but uses them in opposition to the established heroes.

Publication history
Ragnarök first appeared in Civil War #3 (July 2006), and was created by Mark Millar and Steve Mcniven.

Ragnarök began appearing as a regular character in the Dark Avengers series, beginning with Dark Avengers #175.

Fictional character biography
When the real Thor was missing in action and presumed dead, Tony Stark took one of his hairs, which he had retained from the first meeting of the Avengers. He helped Reed Richards and Hank Pym clone the Asgardian DNA within while fusing the cloned DNA with Stark Industries technology. This resulted in the creation of a new cyborg clone of Thor. The clone was put into action during the superhero Civil War, sent to battle anti-registration heroes. The heroes were easily brought down by the cyborg clone, but Hercules helped the heroes to escape. The battle got out of hand when the clone killed Goliath by blasting him through the chest and set out to kill the rest of the anti-registration heroes. Reed Richards deactivated the cyborg with a vocal code and later operated on his brain to prevent such a mishap from happening again. The cyborg clone of Thor returned during the final battle between the pro- and anti-registration heroes. He faced off against Hercules and Storm who defeat the cyborg clone by ramming his own hammer into his skull claiming it was an insult to the Odinson and yelling at the cyborg clone "Thou art no Thor."

The clone's remains were taken to Camp Hammond and stored in the laboratory for experimentation. Baron Von Blitzschlag tells Pym he admires his work, showing the Thor clone to demonstrate this. During the "Secret Invasion" storyline, it was revealed that the Hank Pym who helped create the cyborg clone was actually the clone of a Skrull impostor named Criti Noll who had placed a program into the cloned Thor's remains as a contingency in case of the invasion's failure. Unless a special code which only the Skrull knew was input every eighteen days, the cyborg clone would reawaken. With the clone of Criti Noll's death during the Invasion, this event came to pass during the "Dark Reign" storyline. Malfunctioning and believing himself to be the true Thor, the cyborg clone believed he had been imprisoned in Camp Hammond. He threatened Baron Von Blitzschlag into returning his hammer to him and set out to destroy the Initiative. The cyborg clone swiftly defeated the Initiative's forces and the New Warriors, who had arrived to help. During that time, he took on the name Ragnarök (which the Baron had called him, declaring that he would "bring the end of all that is"). Ragnarök was only stopped when Von Blitzschlag, whose electrical powers made him immune to Ragnarök's lightning, arrived on the battlefield. The Baron showed Ragnarök footage of his creation and showed him that the real Thor had returned and had formed a new Asgard above the city. Disgusted by what he perceived as Asgard's "indignity", Ragnarök left Camp Hammond to confront the real Thor.

During the "Siege" storyline, Volstagg encounters Ragnarök after being released from jail by the Broxton sheriff. Volstagg fights him on an open field to avoid more deaths, but Volstagg is defeated. Thor later fights Ragnarök and easily destroys him.

Norman Osborn later has A.I.M. work on rebuilding Ragnarök so that he can join his second incarnation of the Dark Avengers. Ragnarök is rebuilt under Norman Osborn's control and sent to confront the New Avengers. Ragnarök is heavily damaged in the fight, suffering multiple injuries while fighting Wolverine before Spider-Man throws Iron Fist at him, where Iron Fist's chi-punch nearly destroys him. Ragnarök reappears alongside the former Dark Avengers as one of the new Thunderbolts.

Ragnarök and the Dark Avengers team are thrown into the alternate world of Earth-13584 with John Walker where they are captured by that world's version of Iron Man. Iron Man assumes that Mister Fantastic is responsible for Ragnarök and flies off. Having gotten control of this world's Hank Pym, June Covington learns the history of this reality and then uses some Stark teleportation technology to remove a device from Ragnarök's brain. When Barney Barton wakes up in Iron Man's lab to see U.S. Agent restored, he also sees that Ragnarök is still unconscious and Ai Apaec is in miniature form. Iron Man returns to his tower and finds that Henry Pym is experimenting on Ragnarök by removing his control implant. Moonstone and Ragnarök arrive at the site where this Earth's Thor died and where Thor's hammer Mjolnir lies. Ragnarök acknowledges that he is just a copy of the real Thor and that he does not know who or what he is. He then grasps the hammer. Lightning then strikes and Ragnarök emerges with a new bald-headed look and goatee. Ragnarök then comes crashing down devastating Thing's monsters. As this reality was starting to the sliver of time that A.I.M. having claimed starting to be distorted, the Dark Avengers race to find the A.I.M. base. Their arrival is detected and the A.I.M. agents attempt to close the sliver gate, but Ragnarök manages to keep it open for the entire team to enter. Ragnarök and the rest of the Dark Avengers were able to return to their world.

Powers and abilities
As a cyborg clone of Thor, Ragnarök possesses a portion of the powers and knowledge of the God of Thunder prior to Thor's acquisition of the Odinforce. This includes super-strength, extensive combat knowledge, godly stamina, high resistance to physical injury, immunity to all Earthly diseases, and superhuman agility and reflexes.

Ragnarök's hammer, though not the enchanted Mjolnir, is constructed of a vibranium and adamantium alloy. The hammer is able to absorb and discharge lightning, like the true Mjolnir, and has circuitry within its head, which allows Ragnarök to direct it mentally. However, unlike Mjolnir, it can be picked up or lifted by others.

During a visit to Earth-13584, Ragnarök acquires that universe's version of Mjolnir and is accepted as worthy to wield it.

Reception
In 2022, Screen Rant included Ragnarok in their "10 Most Powerful Hercules Villains In Marvel Comics" list.

Other versions

What If?
In a "What If? Civil War" scenario titled "What if Iron Man Lost the Civil War," Iron Man confronted Captain America and admitted that while he felt he was doing the right thing, he was worried that he was going about it the wrong way and that he needed Cap's help. This admission persuades Captain America not to use a concealed device that would have disabled Iron Man's armor. Unfortunately, an agent on board the S.H.I.E.L.D. Helicarrier detected the device and released Ragnarök prematurely. Reed Richards was quickly knocked out by the clone before Richards could employ the shutdown code. When Ragnarök tried to kill Bill Foster, Iron Man leapt in front of him to block the blast. Ragnarök then attempted to kill Iron Man, but Captain America held him off long enough for Iron Man's armor to repair itself. The two heroes then joined forces, which inspired every other hero in the pro/anti-registration conflict to join together to defeat Ragnarök.

Contest of Champions
The 2015 Contest of Champions series featured an unidentified alternate reality's version of Civil War that had everything go in Tony Stark's favor. He used the Reality Infinity Gem to undo the death of Goliath at the hands of Ragnarök.

In other media

Video games
 Ragnarök appears in Marvel: Avengers Alliance. He appears in Spec-Ops #12 where he is a member of Dell Rusk's Dark Avengers.
 Ragnarök is a playable character in Lego Marvel's Avengers and Lego Marvel Super Heroes 2.
 Ragnarök is a playable character in the match-three mobile game Marvel Puzzle Quest.

Toys
 A figure of Ragnarök was released in Hasbro's 3.75" Marvel Universe Gigantic Battles line, packaged with a 12" Goliath figure.

References

External links
 
 
 

Comics characters introduced in 2006
Characters created by Mark Millar
Cyborg supervillains
Fictional characters with electric or magnetic abilities
Clone characters in comics
Marvel Comics cyborgs
Fictional hammer fighters
Marvel Comics characters who can move at superhuman speeds
Marvel Comics characters with superhuman strength
Norse mythology in popular culture
Thor (Marvel Comics)